Canonbie railway station served the village of Canonbie, Dumfries and Galloway, Scotland from 1862 to 1967 on the Border Union Railway.

History 
The station opened on 5 May 1862 (its first appearance in the Bradshaw timetable) as Canobie by the Border Union Railway. The station was situated on the north side of the B6357. The station's name was changed to Canonbie on 1 February 1904. The goods yard consisted of a loop serving a two-level cattle dock. To the north was a timber goods shed. After closure to passengers on 15 June 1964, the station remained open to goods traffic until 18 September 1967.

References

External links 

Disused railway stations in Dumfries and Galloway
Railway stations in Great Britain opened in 1862
Railway stations in Great Britain closed in 1964
Beeching closures in Scotland
Former North British Railway stations
1967 disestablishments in Scotland
1862 establishments in Scotland